The 1907 Wimbledon by-election was held on 14 May 1907.  The by-election was held due to the resignation of the incumbent Conservative MP, Eric Hambro, due to expanded business interests.   It was won by the Conservative candidate Henry Chaplin, who defeated Liberal Party candidate Bertrand Russell.

References

Wimbledon,1907
Wimbledon by-election
Wimbledon,1907
Wimbledon by-election
Wimbledon by-election